The third season of the American dramedy-mystery television series Desperate Housewives commenced airing on ABC in the United States on September 24, 2006, and concluded on May 20, 2007. The season continues the story of the Wisteria Lane residents, describing their lives in the suburban neighborhood, while dealing with the arrival of the mysterious Orson Hodge. Broadcast in the Sunday night timeslot at 9:00 ET, the season aired twenty-three regular episodes. In addition, two clip shows were produced for the season, in order to put the previous events of the show in perspective. "The Juciest Bites" aired before the seventeenth episode, detailing the events of the first three seasons, in order to introduce the new story arcs in the end of the season. "Secrets and Lies" was narrated by Brenda Strong and was the last clip show to be produced for the series, airing before the inception of the fourth season.

The season received critical acclaim, most critics noting an improvement in the writing after the unsuccessful second season. The production team and the cast members received positive critical response, resulting in numerous awards and nominations. This season also aired the first "disaster episode" of the series, "Bang", which saw the main characters dealing with a shooting in a local supermarket. Despite numerous complaints about scheduling in the previous seasons, Desperate Housewives was one of the few ABC series to keep its original time slot. The highest-rated episode of the season was the season premiere, watched by 24.09 million viewers with an 8.5 rating, ranking second in the week. Buena Vista Home Entertainment officially released the season on DVD in the United States and Canada on September 4, 2007.

Production

Marc Cherry returned as the series' showrunner and executive producer. After leaving the episodic writing to his staff during the second season, he returned as a writer as well. Michael Edelstein and Tom Spezialy, who served as executive producers for seasons one and two, did not return for the series' third season due to creative differences. They were replaced by Kevin Murphy and George W. Perkins, both of whom had previously served as co-executive producers in earlier seasons. John Pardee, Joey Murphy, and Chris Black continued to serve as co-executive producers. Larry Shaw and David Grossman, both of whom previously served as producers and directors for the series, were promoted to co-executive producers, with Bob Daily rounding out the team. All but Black, Grossman, Perkins, and Shaw also served as writers for the third season. Alexandra Cunningham, Jenna Bans, Kevin Etten, Josh Senter, and Dahvi Waller returned to the writing staff and were joined by Susan Nirah Jaffee, Brian A. Alexander, Christian McLaughlin, Valerie Ahern, and Jeff Greenstein. Bans and Etten also served as story editors. Shaw and Grossman continued to direct episodes, as did Wendey Stanzler. New directors for the third season included David Warren, Sanaa Hamri, and Matthew Diamond.

Cherry's decision to advance the storylines by six months for the third-season premiere came as a response to the series' problematic second season. Cherry stated that he regretted most of the second season, as scheduling problems made it difficult to plan the season's storylines. "One of the problems I had with season two was that I had to keep going with the previous year's stuff," he explained that he learned he had to go back to square one to build up the tension again, expressing his own disappointment in the development of the second season. The cast also expressed disappointment in the second season; James Denton considered leaving the show and Marcia Cross confessed "I've been at Marc's door plenty of times with script complaints, going 'You've got to be kidding.'" Cherry stated that the six-month time jump would help the storylines develop quicker, as the second season's storylines lagged. He added: "And I'm going to work much harder to criss-cross all the women's stories so that their lives bump up against each other." To help refresh the show, several new writers were hired, including Greenstein, Joe Keenan, who also served as an executive producer, and Bob Daily, who was also a producer. Daily commented, "When we came on in season three, the mandate was to bring the show back to its roots. That meant having plotlines spring from relatable experiences, no matter how operatic or convoluted." For the season's main mystery, Cherry and the writers wanted to incorporate more of the series' regular characters rather than bringing in various new ones, like they had done in the second season with Betty Applewhite (Alfre Woodard) and her family. They developed the Orson plot line around the "idea that one of our women marries a guy who has dark secrets and possibly a violent streak." Cherry opined: "I thought there was something exciting about that, but real and relatable." Greenstein commented that the writers worked backwards from the second season's cliffhangers to develop the Orson storyline, forsaking the original material that had been developed earlier. The cast responded positively to the new material for the season.

The season is the first to feature Kyle MacLachlan as a series regular. He originally appeared as Orson Hodge in a string of episodes at the end of the second season. The Orson character was originally planned as a romantic interest for Susan, according to executive producer Tom Spezialy, until Cherry decided to pair Orson with Bree. Additionally, when Orson was introduced toward the end of the second season, he was originally to be a con artist. A character portrayed by Julie White appeared in the second-season finale and would have been Orson's accomplice, but the entire storyline was discarded in favor of the mysterious disappearance of Orson's wife and White's character was not seen or mentioned again. MacLachlan commented that his character is "desperate to make this relationship with Bree work. Anything that tries to knock that apart becomes a threat." Cherry called Orson Bree's perfect match, but added that their similarities "will ultimately prove to be the downfall of the relationship."
Kiersten Warren also returned to the series as Nora Huntington after being introduced at the end of the second season. On her storyline, Warren commented, "There's a lot of families who are going through this. Not quite the surprise ooh, boo, child, but children from other marriages and trying to meld these families. I think a lot of people have to deal with it. I think it's fantastic that they're doing this on the show." Dougray Scott made his debut in the season premiere as Ian Hainsworth, Susan's romantic interest. Cherry opined that the character "can legitimately rival Mike for [Susan's] affections." Daily commented on the storyline, saying: "Talk about dark comedy — we're trying to find the humor in these two people bonding over the fact that they each have a partner in a coma." Scott called his character "bumbling at times," adding, "He kind of blossoms after he rediscovers his romantic juices with Susan."

Cast

The third season had eleven roles receiving star billing, with ten of them returning from the previous season, out of whom nine were part of the first season's main cast. The series is narrated by Brenda Strong, who portrays the deceased Mary Alice Young, as she observes from beyond the grave, the lives of the Wisteria Lane residents and her former best friends. Susan Mayer, portrayed by Teri Hatcher, is a divorcée and single mother, who is in a continuous search for a stable relationship. Felicity Huffman portrayed Lynette Scavo, devoted wife and mother of four, in desperate need to get some time for herself. Marcia Cross portrayed Bree Hodge, widow and mother of two, struggling to be perfect in every aspect. Former model Gabrielle Solis, portrayed by Eva Longoria, has to deal with her upcoming motherhood and an unexpected divorce. Nicollette Sheridan portrayed Edie Britt, whose numerous short-term relationships have made her an iconic character. Ricardo Antonio Chavira played Carlos Solis, a rich businessman and Gabrielle's husband, whose affair with his daughter's surrogate mother eventually led to divorce. Andrea Bowen acted as Julie Mayer, the responsible and caring daughter of Susan, whose close relationship to her mother have made her more mature. Doug Savant portrayed Tom Scavo, Lynette's husband, who is trying to welcome his illegitimate daughter among the family he has with his wife. Mike Delfino, now suffering from amnesia following a hit and run, was played by James Denton. Previously a recurring character throughout the last episodes of the previous season, Orson Hodge, portrayed by Kyle MacLachlan, was conceived as a new love interest for Bree, whose mysterious arc is the season's main storyline.

Receiving "also starring" billing were Shawn Pyfrom, portraying Bree's homosexual son Andrew Van de Kamp, Joy Lauren in the role of Danielle Van de Kamp, Bree's irresponsible and rebel daughter, Josh Henderson, portraying Austin McCann, Edie's nephew who begins a relationship with Julie, and Brent Kinsman, Shane Kinsman and Zane Huett, playing Preston Scavo, Porter Scavo and Parker Scavo, Lynette's troublesome children.

Numerous supporting characters have been given expansive and recurring arcs in the progressive storyline. Kathryn Joosten continued her recurring role of neighbor Karen McCluskey, omnipresent in the lives of the Wisteria Lane residents. Pat Crawford Brown portrayed neighbor Ida Greenberg, whereas Jake Cherry appeared in several episodes portraying Travers McLain, Edie's son. Despite having had numerous appearances in the first seasons, Richard Burgi only appeared in one episode in this season, portraying Karl Mayer. Deceased since the first-season finale, Rex Van de Kamp, portrayed by Steven Culp, provided his voice for sixteenth episode, taking over the narration. Part of Lynette's storyline was Nora Huntington, portrayed by Kiersten Warren, portraying the woman Tom had an affair with before meeting Lynette. The affair resulted in Nora getting pregnant with Kayla, now an eleven-year-old, portrayed by Rachel G. Fox. Jason Gedrick portrayed Rick Coletti, who would become a potential love interest for Lynette. Cody Kasch reappeared as Zach Young in a recurring character capacity, following two seasons as a series regular. Mark Moses returned to the series as Paul Young, this time a fellow prisoner of Mike Delfino's, who is trying to win his friendship in order to determine him to get money from his son, Zach. Jesse Metcalfe returned after a year-long absence, portraying John Rowland, Gabrielle's former lover, who is now preparing for an upcoming marriage. Victor Lang, portrayed by John Slattery, immediately becomes a love interest for Gabrielle, following his first appearance in the season's sixteenth episode. Gwendoline Yeo acted as Xiao-Mei, the surrogate mother of Gabrielle and Carlos' child, but is never seen or heard of after it is revealed that the baby she was carrying wasn't the Solises'. Ian Hainsworth, portrayed by Dougray Scott was Susan's main love interest this season, creating a love triangle between the two of them and Mike. Matt Roth played Art Shepherd, a pedophile who temporarily moves to Wisteria Lane. Dakin Matthews appeared as Reverend Sykes, reverend at the local Presbyterian church. Part of the main mystery arc, was Gloria Hodge, played by Dixie Carter, Orson's mother with an inexplicable repugnance towards her son. Alma Hodge, Orson's first wife, who comes on Wisteria Lane seeking reconciliation, was portrayed by Valerie Mahaffey, whereas Carolyn Bigsby, a mysterious woman whose main goal is destroying Orson and Bree's marriage, was portrayed by Laurie Metcalf.

Reception

Critical response 

David Kronke of the Los Angeles Daily News wrote that the show "returns to its wicked wit, dialing back but certainly not eradicating the melodrama." He complimented the four main actresses for their comedic relief and concluded: "Rarely does a show unjump the shark this well; it's back in fine form, calibrating its humor and its menace just right." New York Daily News writer David Bianculli compared the premiere to the show's second season, noting that the episode showed "an assurance and a knowing playfulness that was missing most of last year." He complimented Cherry and Greenstein's script and approved the storylines for each character. Bianculli opined that the episode returned the quality of the show's first season and concluded: "Pass the word: If you've given up on Desperate Housewives, it's time to return to the neighborhood." Entertainment Weekly Lindsay Soll identified Eva Longoria as the episode's strongest performer, declaring that she "definitely looks like the one to watch this season." Soll was glad to see that the Susan character was "a little more toned down and less accident-prone than usual," and called the scenes with Susan and Mike touching. Additionally, she opined that Laurie Metcalf "did a brilliant job of playing the classic television nosy neighbor," but expressed her confusion over the Orson storyline.

Dave Anderson of TV Guide called the season premiere first-rate, while praising the comedic Bree storyline and declaring the set-up for the Orson mystery storyline ingenious. He commended Marcia Cross' performance but opined that Longoria provided the best comedic relief. He also complimented Teri Hatcher's acting, commenting that she "was awesome in the poignant scene where she asks the comatose Mike permission to go on the "almost date" with Ian."  Anderson identified the Scavo storyline as "the weakest link" in the episode and hoped that the Nora and Kayla characters would not remain on the show for too long. TV Guide writer Matt Roush shared similar sentiments regarding the Scavo storyline, stating that while the premiere overall was good, "Lynette is trapped in a story line so desperately unamusing, one that makes her and everyone around her act so idiotic, that you have to pray that we'll soon see the last of the obnoxious Nora, mother of Tom's surprise daughter."  He described the storyline as "painfully unpleasant and unfunny." However, Roush praised the performances of Metcalf and Valerie Mahaffey, while concluding that Desperate Housewives "shows encouraging signs of getting its act together." In a separate review, Roush unfavorably compared the Orson character to Bree's former love interest, George Williams (Roger Bart), while also admitting to being "a bit weary" of the Gabrielle storyline.

USA Today Robert Bianco acknowledged that "Listen to the Rain on the Roof" managed to avoid repeating many of the second season's mistakes noting that the four main characters spend more time together and the annual mystery "is hot-wired into the housewives themselves." Bianco remarked that Cross successfully maintained her position as the series' most prominent lead and was pleased with Susan's storyline, calling it "a conflict that gives Teri Hatcher a genuinely funny, rather than forced, sight gag." He approved of the writers' decision to distance the characters from their second season storylines, but opined: "The harder mistake to overcome is the damage the show did to its main characters — allowing them to behave in ways that made them seem weak, selfish, stupid and, at times, despicable." Bianco concluded: "It will take more than one good episode to win us back after all that. But it's certainly a good place to start." Jen Creer of TV Squad was mixed in her review. She criticized the lack of originality in the storylines, writing that the episode was similar to Sex and the City. Nevertheless, Creer complimented the main actresses, concluding, "I'll be tuning in next week -- for all of its camp and unoriginality, the show does continue to have that certain something, those little twists of genius that make it worth watching." Andy Dehnart of MSNBC was slightly more positive in his review, acknowledging that while "most of the housewives are stuck in their second-season ruts," the show's overall quality has improved, citing the Orson storyline as a welcomed change from the slow-moving Applewhite mystery arc. Overall, Dehnart approved of the episode and felt that the show "may be on track to finally pleasuring its audience in new, albeit familiar ways."

Awards and nominations 

The season received critical acclaim, resulting in numerous awards and nominations for the cast and crew. The 59th Primetime Emmy Awards on September 16, 2007, sees Felicity Huffman receiving a nomination for her portrayal of Lynette Scavo in "Bang", in the Outstanding Actress in a Comedy Series category. Receiving nominations in the Outstanding Guest Actress in a Comedy Series were Dixie Carter, for her portrayal of Gloria Hodge in "Children and Art", and Laurie Metcalf for her performance in "Listen to the Rain on the Roof", playing Carolyn Bigsby". The season finale receives a nomination for Outstanding Costumes, whereas "It Takes Two" was nominated for Outstanding Hairsyling. The production team also received a nomination for Outstanding Casting in a Comedy Series. At the 2007 Bambi Awards, Eva Longoria was for the Television Series International for her portrayal of Gabrielle Solis. The Casting Society of America nominated Junie Lowry-Johnson and Scott Genkinger for Best Comedy Episodic Casting, whereas the Costume Designer's Guild Awards nominated the series for Excellence for Costume Design for Television. At the 19th Gay & Lesbian Alliance Against Defamation Media Awards the series is nominated for Outstanding Comedy Series, while the Imagen Foundation Awards sees Eva Longoria nominated for Best Television Actress. Longoria also received a nomination at the 2007 People's Choice Awards, which resulted in her being awarded as Favorite Television Actress. At the 2007 Monte Carlo TV Festival, the series wins the award for Best Comedy Series in the International TV Audience Award category, following another successful nomination the previous year. Marcia Cross's portrayal of Bree Van de Kamp and Shawn Pyfrom's performance in the role of Andrew Van de Kamp were nominated for Performance in a Comedy Series at the 2007 Prism Awards. Cross was awarded at the Satellite Awards in 2006 for Best Actress in Musical or Comedy Series, whereas Laurie Metcalf's portrayal of Carolyn Bigsby resulted in her receiving a nomination at the same year's ceremony. At the 2007 Screen Actors Guild Awards, the series was nominated for Outstanding Cast in a Comedy Series, following a Choice Television Comedy Show nomination at the Teen Choice Awards, and nomination for Eva Longoria for Choice Television Comedy Actress. The 2006 Young Artist Awards sees both Joy Lauren and Rachel G. Fox for their portrayals of Danielle Van de Kamp and Kayla Huntington Scavo, respectively.

Ratings 

In spite of numerous fan complaints regarding the previous season, the American Broadcasting Company decided to keep Desperate Housewives in its original Sunday night timeslot. However, after two years of airing as a lead-in to fellow ABC series Grey's Anatomy, the series would be followed by Brothers & Sisters, then in its first season, but would remain the lead-out to Extreme Makeover: Home Edition. The show maintained its position as a top ten series and became the tenth most-watched program for the 2006-07 American television season, with an average of 17.5 million viewers per episode. Ratings for the series fell considerably during the season, with a 22 percent loss of viewership toward the end of the season. The highest-rated episode of the season was the season premiere, with 24.09 million viewers tuning in and 8.5 rating, ranking second in the week after the third-season premiere of Grey's Anatomy, which was watched by 25.41 million viewers and received a 9.0 rating. The episode showed a decrease in ratings compared to the previous season premiere, which received a 10.1 rating and was watched by 28.36 million viewers, almost five more million viewers than "Listen to the Rain on the Roof". Although the episode attracted less viewers than Grey's Anatomy "Time Has Come Today", the episode outperformed CSI: Crime Scene Investigation, which would eventually become one of the most-watched series of the 2006–2007 season. The lowest-rated episode was the nineteenth, watched by 15.91 million viewers, receiving a 5.6 rating. It was the second most watched episode of an ABC series in the certain week, only after Grey's Anatomy "Time After Time", which was watched  by 21.12 million viewers, and ranked fourth in the week with a 7.5 rating. The season finale was watched by 18.82 million viewers and ranked seventh in the week, scoring a 6.6 rating. There was a significant decrease in the number of viewers, compared to the previous season finale, which attracted almost seven more million viewers, receiving an 8.6 rating.

Episodes

DVD release

References

External links
 

 
2006 American television seasons
2007 American television seasons